Ilija Pantelić (2 August 1942 – 17 November 2014) was a Serbian footballer who played as a goalkeeper, primarily for Serbian side Vojvodina and French sides Bastia and Paris Saint-Germain, as well as the Yugoslavia national team.

Club career

After playing for BAK Bela Crkva and Radnički Sombor, Pantelić spent eight seasons at Vojvodina between 1961 and 1969. He collected 176 appearances and netted six goals in the Yugoslav First League, helping them win the title in the 1965–66 season. During his time at the club, Pantelić managed to score a hat-trick in a league game against Trešnjevka, as well as a goal against Atlético Madrid in the first leg of the 1966–67 European Cup second round.

In 1969, Pantelić moved to France and joined Paris-Neuilly, before switching to Marseille. He also played for Bastia (1971–1974) and Paris Saint-Germain (1974–1977), amassing over 200 appearances in the top flight of French football.

International career
At international level, Pantelić was capped 18 times for Yugoslavia from 1964 to 1968. He represented the country at UEFA Euro 1968, as Yugoslavia lost to Italy in the final.

Post-playing career
After retiring from the game, Pantelić served as the director of Vojvodina's youth academy for many years.

Honours
Vojvodina
 Yugoslav First League: 1965–66

Marseille
 French Division 1: 1970–71

Yugoslavia
 UEFA European Championship: runner-up 1968

Notes

References

External links
 
 

1942 births
2014 deaths
Sportspeople from Banja Luka
Yugoslav footballers
Serbian footballers
Association football goalkeepers
Yugoslavia international footballers
UEFA Euro 1968 players
Yugoslav First League players
Ligue 1 players
Ligue 2 players
FK Vojvodina players
Olympique de Marseille players
SC Bastia players
Paris Saint-Germain F.C. players
Serbs of Bosnia and Herzegovina
Expatriate footballers in France
Yugoslav expatriate sportspeople in France
Yugoslav expatriate footballers